Ocean Two (sometimes called O2) is a residential skyscraper in the Costa del Este district of Panama City, Panama. Construction of the 73-story,  building began in 2006 and was completed in 2010. At the time of its completion, it became the tallest building in Panama and Latin America. It was then surpassed by The Point in 2011.

Construction was led by architects Pinzón Lozano & Asociados. The facade matches the smaller building Ocean One, standing .

Notable residents 
 Víctor Vergara Muñoz, the son of Franklin Vergara (Panama's health minister from 2009 to 2012)

See also 
 List of tallest buildings in Latin America
 List of tallest buildings in Panama City
 Ocean One

References 

Residential buildings completed in 2010
Residential skyscrapers in Panama City